Chen Zeshi (born 21 February 2005) is a Chinese footballer currently playing as a midfielder for Shandong Taishan in the Chinese Super League.

Club career

Chen started his career with Shandong Luneng (now renamed Shandong Taishan) and was promoted to their senior team during the 2021 Chinese Super League season. Chen made his debut in a Chinese FA Cup game on 18 December 2021 in a game against Qingdao Youth Island that ended in a 3-0 victory at the age of 16 years old and 239 days. He would go on to part of the squad that won the 2021 Chinese FA Cup and 2021 Chinese Super League title. This would be followed up by him winning the 2022 Chinese FA Cup with them the next season.

Career statistics
.

Honours

Club
Shandong Taishan
 Chinese Super League: 2021
 Chinese FA Cup: 2021, 2022

References

External links

Shandong Taishan F.C. players
2005 births
Living people
Chinese footballers
Association football midfielders